The King's Advocate (or Queen's Advocate when the monarch was female) was one of the Law Officers of the Crown. He represented the Crown in the ecclesiastical courts of the Church of England, where cases were argued not by barristers but by advocates (see Doctor's Commons). In the nineteenth century much of the jurisdiction of the ecclesiastical courts was transferred to other courts, firstly the Courts of Probate and Divorce and Matrimonial Causes and eventually the Probate, Divorce and Admiralty Division of the High Court of Justice. The position of Queen's Advocate remained vacant after the resignation of Sir Travers Twiss in 1872.

Use in colonies and extraterritorial jurisdictions
In some British colonies and extraterritorial British courts, the principal British Government lawyer was called the King's Advocate, Queen's Advocate or Crown Advocate.   For example, before the British Supreme Court for China and Japan and in Malta the principal British Government lawyer was called the Crown Advocate.  In Cyprus, he was referred to as the King's Advocate. The Attorney General of Sri Lanka was known as the King's Advocate or Queen's Advocate between 1833 and 1884.

King's/Queen's Advocates
 incomplete before the 18th century
 3 March 1609 Sir Henry (Martin) Marten
1625: Sir Thomas Ryves
 25 July 1701: Sir John Cooke
 13 January 1715: Sir Nathaniel Lloyd
 26 January 1727: George Paul
 23 April 1755: George Hay
 11 September 1764: James Marriott
 2 November 1778: William Wynne
 6 November 1798: John Nicholl
 1 March 1809: Sir Christopher Robinson
 28 February 1828: Sir Herbert Jenner
 18 October 1834: John Dodson (knighted 29 October 1834)
 5 March 1852: John Dorney Harding (knighted 24 March 1852)
 12 September 1862: Robert Joseph Phillimore (knighted 17 September 1862)
 27 August 1867: Travers Twiss (knighted 4 November 1867)

References

Other sources
 Joseph Haydn and Horace Ockerby, The Book of Dignities, London 1894, reprinted Bath 1969, p. 422
 Edward William Brabrook, paper on the Office of the King's Advocate-General, delivered 16 January 1879, recorded in Proceedings of the Society of Antiquaries of London, second series, vol. VIII, p. 13-21

Canon law of the Church of England
English civil law
History of the Church of England
Law Officers of the Crown in the United Kingdom